Shirase may refer to:
 Shirase Nobu (1861–1946), Japanese explorer
 Japanese icebreaker Shirase (AGB-5002), a ship operated by the Japan Maritime Self-Defense Force, decommissioned in July 2008
 Japanese icebreaker Shirase (AGB-5003), a ship which succeeded to the above
 Shirase Coast, Antarctica 
 Shirase Glacier, Antarctica 
 Shirase Bank, Antarctica 
 Battle Programmer Shirase, an anime series